The 2008 Hertsmere Borough Council election took place on 1 May 2008 to elect members of Hertsmere Borough Council in Hertfordshire, England. One third of the council was up for election and the Conservative Party stayed in overall control of the council.

After the election, the composition of the council was:
Conservative 31
Liberal Democrat 5
Labour 3

Election result
The Conservatives won all 4 seats in Bushey, including defeating the Liberal Democrat group leader Robert Gamble in Bushey North by 182 votes. The Conservatives also took Borehamwood Brookmeadow from Labour, with the Labour group leader Ann Harrison holding Borehamwood Cowley Hill by 40 votes.

Following the election Lynne Hodgson became the new leader of the Liberal Democrat group.

Ward results

References

2008 English local elections
2008
2000s in Hertfordshire